Jeffrey Peter Hart (February 23, 1930 – February 16, 2019) was an American cultural critic, essayist, columnist, and Professor Emeritus of English at Dartmouth College.

Life and career
Hart was born and raised in Brooklyn, New York.  After two years as an undergraduate at Dartmouth, he transferred to Columbia University, where he joined the Philolexian Society and obtained his AB (1952) and PhD, both in English literature.

During the Korean War he served in U.S. Naval Intelligence, in Boston.

After a short period teaching at Columbia, Hart became Professor of English literature at Dartmouth for three decades (1963–1993). Hart specialized in 18th century literature but also had a fondness for modernist literature. He was popular with the students, from whom he required a great deal of writing. His political apostasy annoyed his faculty colleagues: when they were concerned about fossil fuels he made it a point to commute to campus in a Cadillac limousine; he might have a mechanical hand drum the table when faculty meetings were too long.

In 1962 he joined William F. Buckley's conservative journal National Review as a book reviewer, requiring a trip from Hanover, New Hampshire to New York City every other week. Later, he would contribute as a writer and senior editor for the better part of the ensuing three decades even as he fulfilled his teaching responsibilities as a professor at Dartmouth. In one review for the magazine he wrote, "The liberal rote anathema on 'racism' is in effect a poisonous assault upon Western self-preference."

Hart took a leave of absence from Dartmouth in 1968 to work for the abortive presidential campaign of Governor of California Ronald Reagan. This role led to brief service as a White House speechwriter for Richard Nixon. After nomination by his former student Reggie Williams, Hart was honored with his college's Outstanding Teaching Award, 1992. He has also received the Young America's Foundation Engalitcheff Prize, 1996, among other academic accolades. In 1998, he served as a visiting lecturer at Nichols College.

The Dartmouth Review was founded in his living room in 1980, and he has served as an adviser to it since then. He wrote a regular column for King Features Syndicate and retired from teaching.

In recent years, he launched a fierce Burkean critique of the policies of President of the United States George W. Bush in the pages of the American Conservative, the Washington Monthly, and The Wall Street Journal. Hart supported John Kerry in the 2004 election and Barack Obama in 2008.

He died on February 16, 2019, a week before his 89th birthday.

Publications

 
 
 
 "Raspail's Superb Scandal". Review of The Camp of the Saints by Jean Raspail. National Review, Vol. 27, September 26, 1975, pp. 1062–1063.
 When the Going was Good: Life in the Fifties (1982)
 From This Moment On: America in 1940 (1987)
 
 
 Smiling Through the Cultural Catastrophe: Toward the Revival of Higher Education  (2001)
 The Making of the American Conservative Mind: National Review and Its Times (2006)

References

External links
 The Burke Habit Prudence, skepticism and "unbought grace."
 Idéologie has taken over
 What is Left? What is Right
 What Went Right in the West and Wrong in Islam
 
 
 

1930 births
2019 deaths
American columnists
American essayists
American male journalists
American political writers
American speechwriters
Dartmouth College faculty
Dartmouth College alumni
Columbia College (New York) alumni
Columbia Graduate School of Arts and Sciences alumni
National Review people
Writers from New Hampshire
Writers from Brooklyn
Richard Nixon
Military personnel from New York City
United States Navy officers
Reagan administration personnel
New York (state) Republicans
New Hampshire Republicans
American male essayists
United States Navy personnel of the Korean War